Achhelal Sonkar is an Indian politician and member of Indian National Congress party. He represented Jabalpur East Vidhan Sabha.

References 

Indian politicians
Madhya Pradesh politicians
Indian National Congress politicians from Madhya Pradesh
Indian National Congress politicians
Year of birth missing (living people)
Living people